A necropolis is a city of the dead (i.e. a cemetery city or mythical place). 

Necropolis may also refer to:

Books
 Necropolis (Pahor novel), a 1967 autobiographic novel by Boris Pahor
 Necropolis (Copper novel), a 1980 gothic novel by Basil Copper
 Necropolis (Horowitz novel), a 2008 'Power of Five' novel by Anthony Horowitz
 Necropolis (Judge Dredd story), a Judge Dredd storyline that ran in 2000 AD and the Judge Dredd Megazine
 Necropolis, the third novel in Dan Abnett's Gaunt's Ghosts series
 Necrópolis, a 2009 novel by the Colombian novelist Santiago Gamboa

Film, TV, and games
 Necropolis (browser game), a browser game implemented in Adobe Flash
 Necropolis (film), a 1970 Italian film
 Necropolis (1986 film), an American horror film
 Necropolis (video game), a 2016 video game.
 "Necropolis", a city populated by ghouls in the 1997 video game Fallout
 Necropolis: Atlanta, a 1994 book for the tabletop role-playing game Wraith: The Oblivion

Music
 Necropolis Records, an American record label
 Necropolis (album), a 2009 album by Polish death metal band Vader
 "Necropolis", a song by The Black Dahlia Murder from the album Deflorate
 "Necropolis", a song by Manilla Road from the album Crystal Logic
 "Necropolis", a song by Kamelot from the album Poetry for the Poisoned

See also
 London Necropolis Company, a company which provided out-of-town burials, and later specialised in exhumations
 Toronto Necropolis, a historic cemetery in Toronto, Ontario, Canada
 Rookwood Cemetery, officially named Rookwood Necropolis and historically simply referred to Necropolis, a cemetery in Sydney, Australia